Eucyclotoma lactea is a species of sea snail, a marine gastropod mollusk in the family Raphitomidae.

Description
The length of the shell varies between 9 mm and 16 mm

Distribution
This marine species occurs off Taiwan and French Polynesia

References

 Liu J.Y. [Ruiyu] (ed.)(2008). Checklist of marine biota of China seas. China Science Press. 1267 pp.

External links
 
 Li B.-Q. [Baoquan & Li X.-Z. [Xinzheng] (2014) Report on the Raphitomidae Bellardi, 1875 (Mollusca: Gastropoda: Conoidea) from the China Seas. Journal of Natural History 48(17-18): 999-1025]

lactea
Gastropods described in 1843